Patrick Alfredo Womsiwor (born 26 May 2001) is an Indonesian professional footballer who plays as a midfielder for Liga 1 club Barito Putera.

Club career

Persipura Jayapura
He was signed for Persipura Jayapura to play in Liga 1. Womsiwor made his league debut on 28 October 2019 against Badak Lampung at the Sumpah Pemuda Stadium, Bandar Lampung.

Persewar Waropen
In 2021, Womsiwor signed a contract with Indonesian Liga 2 club Persewar Waropen. He made his league debut on 3 November 2021 against Sulut United at the Batakan Stadium, Balikpapan.

Barito Putera
On 20 January 2023, Womsiwor signed a one-year contract with Liga 1 club Barito Putera from Persipura Jayapura. one day later, Womsiwor made his league debut for the club in a 0–0 draw against Borneo Samarinda, coming on as a substituted Mike Ott.

Career statistics

Club

Notes

References

External links
 Patrick Womsiwor at Soccerway
 Patrick Womsiwor at Liga Indonesia

2001 births
Living people
Indonesian footballers
Persipura Jayapura players
Liga 1 (Indonesia) players
People from Jayapura Regency
Association football midfielders
Sportspeople from Papua